Schindellegi-Feusisberg is a railway station in the Swiss canton of Schwyz and municipality of Feusisberg. It takes its name from the nearby village of Schindellegi. The station is on the Pfäffikon SZ to Arth-Goldau line, and the Wädenswil to Einsiedeln railway line, which are owned by the Südostbahn.

The station is served by Zurich S-Bahn services S13, from Einsiedeln to Wädenswil, and S40, from Einsiedeln to Rapperswil.

References

External links 
 

Schindellegi-Feusisberg
Schindellegi-Feusisberg